{{DISPLAYTITLE:Iota1 Scorpii}}

Iota1 Scorpii, Latinized from ι1 Scorpii, is star in the southern constellation of Scorpius. With an apparent visual magnitude of 3.03, this star can be seen with the naked eye. It is sometimes called by the proper name Apollyon.

This star has a stellar classification of F2 Ia, with the 'Ia' luminosity class indicating this is a supergiant more luminous than typical supergiants. It has about 12 times the Sun's mass and is radiating about  35,070 times the Sun's luminosity. The radius is uncertain, with estimates ranging from 125 to 400 times that of the Sun. The effective temperature of the outer envelope is about 7,000 K, which gives it a yellow-white hue typical of an F-type star.

Iota1 Scorpii has a 10th magnitude companion at an angular separation of 37.5 arcseconds, which, at the distance of this star, gives it a projected separation of 20,000 Astronomical Units (AU). As the relative separation of the two stars along the line of sight to the Earth is not known, however, this distance represents only a minimum value for their separation.

References

Scorpii, Iota1
Scorpius (constellation)
F-type supergiants
Durchmusterung objects
161471
6615
087073